The 1934 Calgary municipal election was held on November 21, 1934 to elect six Aldermen to sit on Calgary City Council. Along with positions on Calgary City Council, a Commissioner, three trustees for the Public School Board, and two trustees for the Separate School Board. Nominations closed on November 5, 1934.

Calgary City Council governed under "Initiative, Referendum and Recall" which is composed of a Mayor, Commissioner and twelve Aldermen all elected to staggered two year terms. Mayor Andrew Davison and six Aldermen: Joseph Brown Seymour, Alexander John MacMillan, William George Southern, Joseph Hope Ross, Harold William Hounsfield Riley and Robert Henry Weir elected in 1933 continued in their positions.

Background
The election was held under the Single Transferable Voting/Proportional Representation (STV/PR) with the term for candidates being two years.

The great depression played a significant role in the 1934 election as many Calgarians were out of work. A candidate meeting at the Elks Lodge was interrupted by a relief worker who was subsequently arrested by police. Members of the crowd surged towards the gallery in defense of the worker forcing Mayor Davison to end the meeting when he realized order could not be restored.

The Calgary Herald advocated on behalf of the Civic Government Association prior to the election arguing that Labour Aldermen and trustees had failed to effectively run the city.

Results
Results from Calgary Daily Herald.

Commissioner

Council
Quota for election was 3,286.

Public School Board
The quota was 3,053

Separate school board

Plebiscites

Material for Works Program
Material for works program for unemployed.
For - 3,395
Against - 4,634

City manager
An appointed city manager.
For - 10,458
Against - 12,798

See also
List of Calgary municipal elections

References

1930s in Calgary
Municipal elections in Calgary
1934 elections in Canada